Skottie Young (born March 3, 1978) is an American comic book artist, children's book illustrator and writer. He is best known for his work with various Marvel Comics characters, his comic book adaptations of L. Frank Baum's Oz books with Eric Shanower, his I Hate Fairyland comic book series, and a series of novels with Neil Gaiman.

Career

Young moved from Tennessee to Chicago in 2000 at which time he began working for Marvel Comics.  Early projects included illustrating the Spider-Man Legend of the Spider Clan mini-series as part of the Marvel Mangaverse as well as the Human Torch and the New X-Men for which he also wrote an issue.

Young illustrated a six issue New Warriors mini-series released beginning in June 2005, written by Zeb Wells featuring the team as the stars of a reality TV show.

He has drawn covers for many books including Cable & Deadpool, Spider-Man, Deadpool and Iron Man along with a popular series of Baby Variant covers for dozens of Marvel titles 

He has gained critical acclaim for his work on the New York Times Best Selling and Eisner Award winning series The Wonderful Wizard of Oz published by Marvel Comics. He and collaborator Eric Shanower adapted the next five books in the Oz series, but there are currently no plans to continue with any of the eight books remaining in Baum's original series.

Young wrote and drew a Rocket Raccoon solo series for Marvel Comics starting in July 2014.  Though the series precedes the release of the Marvel Studios film Guardians of the Galaxy, there was no mandate to respect the movie's continuity.  Young commented at the time "I think it's going to have a connection to that nostalgic feeling for 'Looney Tunes,' that old animated flavor where everything wasn't squeaky clean, you know? Daffy Duck would get his bill blasted off with double barrel shotguns... That's what I grew up watching, and being able to play around with that in this hyper-superhero intergalactic universe will be a lot of fun."

From October 2015 to July 2018, Young wrote and illustrated the first 20 issues of I Hate Fairyland, a comic book series that he created. The series was published through Image Comics.

In 2018, As part of the Fresh Start relaunch of Marvel's titles, he became writer of Deadpool.
In June 2019 Marvel Comics published The Marvel Art Of Skottie Young.

In August 2021, Young launched a Substack newsletter, where he announced that I Hate Fairyland would be returning from its hiatus. Future issues of the series, which will resume publication through Image Comics, will be written by Young and illustrated by Brett Parson, while additional side stories illustrated by other artists will be released as timed exclusives through Young's Substack before later publication.

Personal life
Young currently lives in Prairie Village, Kansas with his wife, Casey McCauley and their two children.

Bibliography

Cable & Deadpool #35–50 (cover art)
New X-Men (2004 series) #37–43
Human Torch #1–6
Venom #14–18
New Warriors: Reality Check #1–6
Runaways/X-Men: Free #1
Spider-Man: Legend of The Spider Clan #1–4
Oz series
The Wonderful Wizard of Oz #1–8
The Marvelous Land of Oz #1–8
Ozma of Oz #1–8
Dorothy and the Wizard in Oz #1–8
The Road to Oz #1–6
The Emerald City of Oz #1–5
Ultimate Comics: Spider-Man #150
Rocket Raccoon #1–11
I Hate Fairyland #1–20
Deadpool #1–15
Twig #1–5
Bully Wars #1–present
Middlewest #1-present
Strange Academy #1-18
The Me You Love in the Dark #1-5
Strange Academy: Finals #1-present

References

External links

Skottie Young on Marvel.com
Skottie Young Interview Podcast  from Comic Addiction 
Part I of an audio interview with Skottie 

Artists from Chicago
Living people
1978 births
American comics artists
People from Fairbury, Illinois
21st-century American artists
Eisner Award winners for Best Penciller/Inker or Penciller/Inker Team